is a river located in the Minami-ku Ishiyama area of southern Sapporo in Hokkaidō, Japan. It is a tributary of the Toyohira River and classified as class A river. It is 9.4 km long and has a catchment area of 8.9 km2.

Engineering
The Sapporo River Work Office built a sand control dam on the Anano River with a sand-retarding basin.

References 

Rivers of Hokkaido
Rivers of Japan